Stoykite Buttress (‘Rid Stoykite’ \'rid 'stoy-ki-te\) is the ice-covered buttress descending from elevation 1650 to 1000 m in the southwest foothills of Detroit Plateau on Nordenskjöld Coast in Graham Land.  It is situated between west-flowing tributaries to Drygalski Glacier, and has precipitous, partly ice-free northwest and southeast slopes.  The feature is named after the settlement of Stoykite in Southern Bulgaria.

Location
British mapping in 1978.

Maps
 British Antarctic Territory.  Scale 1:200000 topographic map.  DOS 610 Series, Sheet W 64 60.  Directorate of Overseas Surveys, Tolworth, UK, 1978.
 Antarctic Digital Database (ADD). Scale 1:250000 topographic map of Antarctica. Scientific Committee on Antarctic Research (SCAR). Since 1993, regularly upgraded and updated.

Notes

References
 Stoykite Buttress. SCAR Composite Antarctic Gazetteer.
 Bulgarian Antarctic Gazetteer. Antarctic Place-names Commission. (details in Bulgarian, basic data in English)

External links
 Stoykite Buttress. Copernix satellite image

Mountains of Graham Land
Nordenskjöld Coast
Bulgaria and the Antarctic